The BBCH-scale (weed) identifies the phenological development stages of weed species.  It is a plant species specific version of the BBCH-scale.

D = Dicotyledons
G = Gramineae
M = Monocotyledons
P = Perennial plants
V = Development from vegetative parts or propagated organs
No code letter is used if the description applies to all groups of plants.

References

External links
Weed Scale

BBCH-scale